Aleksandar Šolić (born 29 January 1983 in Rijeka) is a Croatian retired football player who last played for NK Opatija.

Career

International
He received a call-up from Bosnia and Herzegovina in May 2007, but did not make his debut. In the 2009–2010 season he was named the best player in Azerbaijan.

Career statistics

Honours
FK Baku
Azerbaijan Cup (2): 2009–10, 2011–12

References

External links
 

1983 births
Living people
Footballers from Rijeka
Association football midfielders
Croatian footballers
Bosnia and Herzegovina footballers
NK Pomorac 1921 players
NK Karlovac players
NK Zadar players
NK Hrvatski Dragovoljac players
NK Osijek players
FC Baku players
Al-Najma SC (Bahrain) players
NK Opatija players
Croatian Football League players
Croatian expatriate footballers
Expatriate footballers in Bahrain
Croatian expatriate sportspeople in Bahrain
Expatriate footballers in Azerbaijan
Croatian expatriate sportspeople in Azerbaijan